Achaea albicilia is a species of moth of the family Erebidae first described by Francis Walker in 1858. It is found in the Democratic Republic of the Congo, the Gambia, Ivory Coast, Malawi, Nigeria, Sierra Leone, South Africa, Tanzania and Uganda.

The larvae have been recorded on mango.

References

Achaea (moth)
Moths of Africa
Lepidoptera of West Africa
Moths described in 1858